Ouija  (also known as Ouija: Game Never Ends) is a 2015 Kannada-language supernatural horror film produced by Vikram Raju under the Vega Entertainment banner. The movie is directed by Raaj Kumar Reddy. The film stars Bharath, Shraddha Das, Gayathri Iyer, Madhuri Itagi, Kadambari Jethwani, Sayaji Shinde, Avinash, Raja Ravindra and Raghu Kunche. The films' music has been composed by  Hari Nikesh. The stunt sequences in the film were directed by action director William Ong. All five songs for the film have been choreographed by Raghu Master. The major portion of this film was shot in Malaysia and Bangalore with a few scenes being shot in Hyderabad.
Aata.
Ouija was first released in India on 6 November 2015.

Cast 

 Bharat as Bala Raju
 Shraddha Das as Maaya
 Gayathri Iyer as Kshetra 
 Madhuri Itagi as Krishna
 Kadambari Jethwani as Niharika
 Avinash as Iliyas
 Sayaji Shinde as Santan Fakhir
 Raja Ravindra as KK
 Raghu Kunche as Dheeraj
 Ganesh Shankar as Sridhar
 Naveen Krishna
 Ajay Raj

Soundtrack

References

External links

2010s Kannada-language films
2015 horror films
2010s supernatural horror films
Indian supernatural horror films
Films shot in Bangalore
Films shot in Malaysia
Films shot in Hyderabad, India